Greg Carlson (born March 5, 1948) is a former American football coach. He waas the head football coach at Wabash College from 1983 to 2001, at Whittier College from 2003 to 2005, and at the College of St. Scholastica from 2008 to 2013. Carlson was hired in 2007 as St. Scholastica's first football coach. The program began play the following season in 2008.

Coaching career
Carlson was the 30th head football coach at Wabash College in Crawfordsville, Indiana, and he held that position for 18 seasons, from 1983 until 2000. His career coaching record at Wabash was 112–57–2. This ranks him second at Wabash in total wins and eighth at Wabash in winning percentage (.661). He was also an assistant football coach at University of Evansville in 1977.

Head coaching record

College

References

External links
 St. Scholastica profile

1948 births
Living people
Ball State Cardinals football coaches
Evansville Purple Aces football coaches
Illinois Fighting Illini football coaches
St. Scholastica Saints football coaches
Wabash Little Giants football coaches
Whittier Poets football coaches
Los Angeles Avengers coaches
University of Oklahoma alumni
University of Wisconsin–Oshkosh alumni